iKeyMonitor is a monitoring program for iPhone and Android phones and tablets. It is designed for parental control and employee monitoring. Featured as a parental control tool, iKeyMonitor can be used to remotely monitor activities on children's phones, such as SMS, voice messages, calls, social chats, GPS and more information.

History 
iKeyMonitor is involved in the development of software for phones and computers to keep track of the activities of children and/or employees from a central location. iKeyMonitor helps to monitor and record children/employees' activity on their phones/Macs including chat logs, emails, web history, application usage and more. In 2012, iKeyMonitor was released as jailbreak spy for iPhone. Support for Android devices was released in 2014 with Android 2.3.x support. In 2017 the iKeyMonitor iPhone spy no jailbreak service was added and the iSpyTracker cloud panel app for iKeyMonitor was released.

Features 
iKeyMonitor works on jailbroken and non-jailbroken iPhone/iPad, rooted and non-rooted Android phones and tablets.

iKeyMonitor allows:
 Keyword notification: send alerts periodically and capture screenshots when keywords are triggered
 Access: contacts, calendars, reminders, browser bookmarks, web history in Google Chrome, Safari, and Android stock browser
 Logging: SMS, text messages in Facebook Messenger, WhatsApp, WeChat, Snapchat, call history, GPS location 
 Recording: surrounding, calls, and voice messages
 Remote control: block apps and games with specified rules, such as allowing the maximum daily usage time, blocking apps during a specific period, blocking apps all the time and unblock temporarily.

See also 
Parental controls
Employee monitoring

References 

Mobile technology companies
Mobile applications